The following is a list of churches in Teignbridge.

Active churches 
There are churches in every civil parish. The district has an estimated 116 churches for 129,600 people, a ratio of one church to every 1,117 people.

Defunct churches

References 

Teignbridge
 
Churches